Mahonia cardiophylla is a shrub in the  Berberidaceae described as a species in 2001. it is endemic to China, native to the provinces of Guangxi, Hunan, Sichuan, and Yunnan.

References

breviracema
Endemic flora of China
Plants described in 2001